Lost in Transition is the sixth studio album by the band Sixpence None the Richer released on August 7, 2012, via Tyger Jim label. It is the first album full of mostly original material since 2002's Divine Discontent. The interim period included several new tracks for a greatest hits album, several solo projects for lead singer Leigh Nash, a 2008 album containing mostly Christmas standards, and the My Dear Machine EP. "My Dear Machine", "Sooner Than Later," and "Give It Back" (under the title "Amazing Grace (Give it Back)") all appeared on the EP, although the latter two were completely re-recorded.

Track listing

Personnel 

 Leigh Nash – vocals
 Matt Slocum – guitar, cello
 Justin Cary –  bass, baritone guitar
 Will Sayles – drums, percussion, photography
 Jim Scott – producer, engineer, mixing, percussion (2–12)
 Daniel Tashian – producer(1)
 Jason Lehning – keyboards (1), mixing
 John Painter – horns (1)
 Cason Cooley – keyboards (2–12)
 Greg Leisz –  pedal steel guitar, lap steel guitar (2–12)
 Kevin Dean – additional engineer (2–12)
 Bob Ludwig – mastering
 Don Clark – art direction, design

References 

2012 albums
Sixpence None the Richer albums
Albums produced by Jim Scott (producer)